An independent clause (or main clause) is a clause that can stand by itself as a simple sentence. An independent clause contains a subject and a predicate and makes sense by itself.

Independent clauses can be joined by using a semicolon or by using a comma followed by a coordinating conjunction (and, but, for, or, nor, so, yet, etc.).

Examples
In the following example sentences, independent clauses are underlined, and conjunctions are in bold.

Single independent clauses:
I have enough money to buy an ice cream cone.
My favourite flavour is chocolate.
Let's go to the shop.
Multiple independent clauses:
I have enough money to buy an ice cream cone; my favourite flavour is chocolate.
I have enough money to buy an ice cream cone, so let's go to the shop.

See also
Comma splice
Conditional sentence
Dependent clause
Relative clause
Run-on sentence
Sentence clause structure

References

External links
 Clauses: Independent, The Tongue Untied
 Clauses, Online Writing Lab
 Independent & Dependent Clauses, My Schoolhouse

Clauses